Anshuman Dattajirao Gaekwad  (born 23 September 1952) is a former Indian cricketer and two-time Indian national cricket coach. He played in 40 Test matches and 15 One Day Internationals. His father Datta Gaekwad also played Test Cricket for India.

Gaekwad was known for his defensive mindset against pace bowlers, which became a high priority when the West Indian pace bowlers dominated world cricket. He was nicknamed The Great Wall. He made his Test debut against the West Indies at Kolkata on 27 December 1974 and his last appearance in a Test match was against England at Kolkata itself on the last day of 1984. Being a right-handed batsman, Gaekwad scored 1985 runs from 40 Tests at an average of 30.07 with 2 centuries and 10 half centuries to his credit. He scored his highest Test score of 201 against Pakistan at Jalandhar in 1982–83. This innings, where he spent 671 minutes, is an example for his patient style and concentration.

Anshuman Gaekwad worked for GSFC (Vadodara) after retiring from cricket and took early retirement in 2000. He is currently based in Vadodara, Gujarat, India.

In June 2018, he was awarded with the Lifetime Achievement Award by the Board of Control for Cricket in India.

References

External links
 

1952 births
Living people
Baroda cricketers
Cricketers at the 1979 Cricket World Cup
Cricketers at the 1975 Cricket World Cup
Coaches of the Indian national cricket team
Indian cricketers
India Test cricketers
India One Day International cricketers
Indian cricket administrators
Indian cricket coaches
India national cricket team selectors
Indian Universities cricketers
West Zone cricketers
Cricketers from Mumbai